Kentucky Route 163 (KY 163) is a  state highway that traverses through two counties in south-central Kentucky. It runs from Tennessee State Route 51 at the Kentucky-Tennessee border south of Hestand to U.S. Route 68, Kentucky Route 80, and East Stockton Street in Edmonton via Tompkinsville.

Route description
The highway starts at the Tennessee state line in southern Monroe County on the road where going south, it continues as Tennessee State Route 51. KY 163 then heads southeast passing through Hestand before reaching the city of Tompkinsville, where it meets KY 100 and KY 63. KY 163 then enters Metcalfe County, and crosses KY 90 at Beaumont. KY 163 ends in the city of Edmonton at an intersection with U.S. Route 68 (US 68) and KY 80.
Since the route of KY 163 was moved in 2020 to the 3.8 mile Tompkinsville Bypass, KY 375 acts as a 3.3 mile alternate route of KY 163 in downtown Tompkinsville, as the north and south endpoints are at KY 163.

Since 2002, the first  of KY 163, along with the entire Tennessee Route 51 corridor, and several other routes, is part of the designated route of the annual Roller Coaster Yard Sale, an outdoor second-hand yard sale event that takes place in the first weekend of October. The specified section of KY 163 is also part of the Cordell Hull Scenic Byway, one of Kentucky's Scenic Byway routes.

History 
In addition to KY 163's current alignment through Monroe and southern Metcalfe Counties, KY 163 ran an additional  to end at a junction with KY 70, another major state route, at Sulphur Well. KY 70 alone went northward to Greensburg (Green County) and Campbellsville (Taylor County) at that point. KY 163's northern terminus was relocated to its current location when US 68 was rerouted onto this route during the 1940s. Since then, KY 70 ran concurrent with US 68 all the way to Campbellsville.

Major intersections

References

0163
0163
0163